"Kaya Natin Ito!" (We Can Do It!) is a charity single made to benefit the victims of the Typhoon Ondoy (Ketsana) and Typhoon Pepeng (Parma) in 2009 that killed more than half a million people all over the country.

Song information
The song was written by Ogie Alcasid, a famous singer/composer in the Philippines. This song was served as an inspiration to all victims to stand up and continue the journey. From the overflowing rivers to raging flashfloods in the Metro Manila area, up to the non-stop rains in the Northern Luzon came up with thousands of death, loss of belongings and much poverty. The song was sung by more than 50 Filipino artists, including their well-known artists like Lea Salonga, Gary Valenciano, Regine Velasquez, Sharon Cuneta, Jaya and many more. Ogie Alcasid also made part of the song.

Artists for Ondoy and Pepeng Victims
Composer
Ogie Alcasid

Soloists/Choirs (in order of appearance)

 The Opera
 Ogie Alcasid
 Jose Mari Chan
 Janno Gibbs
 Rachelle Ann Go
 Jinky Vidal
 Michael V.
 Sarah Geronimo
 Jay R
 Jolina Magdangal
 Christian Bautista
 La Diva
 Gary Valenciano
 Martin Nievera
 Regine Velasquez
 Vina Morales
 Rachel Alejandro
 Geneva Cruz
 KC Concepcion
 Jett Pangan
 Dingdong Avanzado

 Randy Santiago
 Agot Isidro
 Gino Padilla
 Jaya
 Jay Durias
 Gian Magdangal
 Lovi Poe
 Chris Cayzer
 Yeng Constantino
 Karylle
 Luke Mejares
 Viktoria
 Sitti
 Wency Cornejo
 The Company
 Noel Cabangon
 Amber Davis
 Aiza Seguerra
 Richard Poon
 Renz Verano

 Jan Nieto
 Denise Laurel
 Bo Cerrudo
 Kris Lawrence
 Duncan Ramos
 Josh of Freestyle
 Iya Villania
 Lea Salonga
 Rico Blanco
 Nina
 Joey Generoso of Side A
 Charice
 Arnel Pineda
 Piolo Pascual
 Kyla
 Aga Muhlach
 Moymoy Palaboy
 Frenchie Dy

 Erik Santos
 Jed Madela
 Mark Bautista
 Zsa Zsa Padilla
 Juris
 Pops Fernandez
 Sharon Cuneta
 Nonito Donaire
 Bing Loyzaga
 The Ryan Cayabyab Singers
 Thor
 Mae Flores
 Miguel Escueta

Adlibs
 Gary Valenciano
 Janno Gibbs
 Rico Blanco
 Christian Bautista
 Nina
 Jed Madela
 Thor
 Montet Acoymo
 Josephine Gomez
 Regine Velasquez
Rap
 Andrew E.

Anne Curtis had a silent cameo in the music video. 

All-star recordings
Songs against racism and xenophobia
Charity singles
2009 debut singles
2009 songs
Philippine pop songs